The Sidmouth Rock is a rock islet or small island, located in the Southern Ocean, off the southern coast of Tasmania, Australia.

Location and features

The islet is frequently wave-washed and supports no land-dwelling life.

Important Bird Area
Together with the nearby Eddystone and Pedra Branca islets, Sidmouth Rock constitutes the  Pedra Branca Important Bird Area, identified as such by BirdLife International because it supports over 1% of the world populations of shy albatrosses and Australasian gannets.

See also

 List of islands of Tasmania

References

Islands of Tasmania
Protected areas of Tasmania
Important Bird Areas of Tasmania
Islands of South West Tasmania